8th Rifle Division can refer to:

 8th Guards Motor Rifle Division
 8th Motor Rifle Division NKVD
 8th Rifle Division (Soviet Union)
 8th Siberian Rifle Division